Druzhba is a rural locality (a settlement) in Charyshsky Selsoviet, Ust-Kalmansky District, Altai Krai, Russia. The population was 96 as of 2013. There are 2 streets.

Geography 
Druzhba is located 19 km north of Ust-Kalmanka (the district's administrative centre) by road. Ust-Zhuravlikha is the nearest rural locality.

References 

Rural localities in Ust-Kalmansky District